Aqua Jack (also released as Aquattack) is a 3D shoot 'em up arcade video game released by Taito in 1989. A hovercraft is piloted over water and land while dodging bullets and avoiding objects by shooting or jumping over them. Enemies are shot in the air and on water or land to advance levels. The game has eight levels.

Reception 
In Japan, Game Machine listed Aqua Jack on their October 15, 1989 issue as being the fourteenth most-successful upright/cockpit arcade unit of the month.

References

External links

1989 magazine review

1989 video games
Arcade video games
Arcade-only video games
Naval video games
Romstar games
Shoot 'em ups
Taito arcade games
Taito Z System games
Video games developed in Japan